Vladimir Božović (born 13 November 1981) is a Montenegrian professional football coach and a former player who is the head coach of FK Sušica Kragujevac. He earned 42 international caps for Montenegro between 2007 and 2014.

Club career
Born in Peć, modern day Kosovo, Božović moved to Kragujevac at an early age. He played for local clubs Sušica and Zastava, before transferring to OFK Beograd in the summer of 2001. Subsequently, Božović spent six seasons with the Romantičari, reaching the final of the Serbia and Montenegro Cup in 2006. He also had two loan spells at Proleter Zrenjanin (2002 and 2004).

In the summer of 2007, Božović signed for Romanian club Rapid București. He made over 150 competitive appearances for the side, winning the domestic Super Cup in his debut year. In the 2013 winter transfer window, Božović moved to Russia and joined Mordovia Saransk.

In early 2016, Božović returned to Serbia and joined his parent club Sušica, helping them earn promotion to the Morava Zone League. He stayed there for a year, before switching to fellow Kragujevac side Šumadija 1903, competing in the Serbian League West. In early 2018, Božović made another return to Sušica, helping them remain in the fourth tier of Serbian football.

International career
Božović was among the founding members of the Montenegro national team, starting their inaugural match versus Hungary on 24 March 2007. He played regularly for the country in the following seven years, collecting 42 appearances to his name.

Honours
OFK Beograd
 Serbia and Montenegro Cup: Runner-up 2005–06
Rapid București
 Supercupa României: 2007
 Cupa României: Runner-up 2011–12
Mordovia Saransk
 Russian Football National League: 2013–14

References

External links
 Srbijafudbal profile
 
 
 
 

1981 births
Living people
Sportspeople from Peja
Association football fullbacks
Association football wingers
Serbia and Montenegro footballers
Montenegrin footballers
Montenegro international footballers
OFK Beograd players
FK Proleter Zrenjanin players
FC Rapid București players
FC Mordovia Saransk players
FK Šumadija 1903 players
First League of Serbia and Montenegro players
Second League of Serbia and Montenegro players
Serbian SuperLiga players
Montenegrin First League players
Liga I players
Russian Premier League players
Russian First League players
Montenegrin expatriate footballers
Expatriate footballers in Romania
Montenegrin expatriate sportspeople in Romania
Expatriate footballers in Russia
Montenegrin expatriate sportspeople in Russia
Montenegrin football managers